Brigitte Helm (born Brigitte Gisela Eva Schittenhelm, 17 March 1908 – 11 June 1996) was a German actress, best remembered for her dual role as Maria and her double named Futura, in Fritz Lang's 1927 silent film, Metropolis.

Early life and film career
Brigitte Gisela Eva Schittenhelm was born on 17 March 1908 in Berlin, the daughter of Gretchen Gertrud Martha Schittenhelm (née Tews) and Edwin Alexander Johannes Schittenhelm. Helm's first role was that of Maria in Metropolis, which she began work on while only 18 years old. After Metropolis, Helm made over 30 other films, including talking pictures, before retiring in 1935. Her other appearances include The Love of Jeanne Ney (1927), Alraune (1928), L'Argent (1928), Gloria (1931), The Blue Danube (1932), L'Atlantide (1932), and Gold (1934). Helm was considered for the title role in Bride of Frankenstein before Elsa Lanchester was given the role. She signed a ten-year contract with UFA in 1925.

Personal life
Helm was involved in several traffic accidents, and was briefly imprisoned.  According to the Nazi Party's Press Chief Obergruppenführer Otto Dietrich's book, The Hitler I Knew, Adolf Hitler saw that manslaughter charges against her from an automobile accident were dropped.

Helm married her second husband, Dr. Hugo Kunheim, an industrialist, after her film contract expired in 1935.  Helm stated that she retired from films because she was "...disgusted with the Nazi takeover of the film industry..." In 1935, she moved to Switzerland, where she had four children with Kunheim. In her later years, she refused to grant any interviews concerning her film career.

Helm died, 11 June 1996, in Ascona, Switzerland.

Selected filmography
 Metropolis (1927), director: Fritz Lang
 At the Edge of the World, (Am Rande der Welt, 1927), director: Karl Grune
 The Love of Jeanne Ney (Die Liebe der Jeanne Ney, 1927), director: G.W. Pabst
 Alraune (1928), director: Henrik Galeen; title role
 The Devious Path also known as Abwege (1928) director: G.W. Pabst
 Yacht of the Seven Sins (Die Yacht der sieben Sünden, 1928), directors: Jacob Fleck, Luise Fleck
 L'Argent (1928), director: Marcel L'Herbier
 Scandal in Baden-Baden (Skandal in Baden-Baden, 1929), director: Erich Waschneck
 Manolescu (1929), director: Victor Tourjansky
 The Wonderful Lies of Nina Petrovna (Die wunderbare Lüge der Nina Petrowna, 1929), director: Hanns Schwarz
 The Singing City (Die singende Stadt, 1930), director Carmine Gallone
 Alraune (1930), director: Richard Oswald; title role
 Gloria (1931), director: Hans Behrendt
 Gloria (1931), director: Yvan Noé
 In the Employ of the Secret Service (Im Geheimdienst, 1931), director: Gustav Ucicky
 The Blue Danube (1932), director: Herbert Wilcox
 The Countess of Monte Cristo (Die Gräfin von Monte-Christo, 1932), director: Karl Hartl
 The Mistress of Atlantis (Die Herrin von Atlantis, 1932) director: G.W. Pabst
 Three on a Honeymoon (Hochzeitsreise zu dritt, 1932), director: Erich Schmidt
 Honeymoon Trip (Voyage de noces, 1933), directors: Germain Fried, Joe May, Erich Schmidt
 The Marathon Runner (Der Läufer von Marathon, 1933), director: Ewald André Dupont
 Spies at Work (Spione am Werk, 1933), director: Gerhard Lamprecht
 The Star of Valencia (L'Étoile de Valencia, 1933), director: Serge de Poligny
 Happy Days in Aranjuez (Die schönen Tage von Aranjuez, 1933), director: Johannes Meyer
 Inge and the Millions (Inge und die Millionen, 1933), director: Erich Engel
 Gold (1934), director: Karl Hartl
 The Island (Die Insel, 1934), director: Hans Steinhoff
 Count Woronzeff (Fürst Woronzeff, 1934), director: Arthur Robison
 An Ideal Husband (Ein idealer Gatte, 1935), director: Herbert Selpin
 Wie im Traum (1978, short), director: Egon Haase

References

Notes

Further reading

External links 
 
 Virtual History - Tobacco cards
 German Brigitte Helm Memorial page
 

1906 births
1996 deaths
20th-century German actresses
Actresses from Berlin
German film actresses
German silent film actresses
Emigrants from Nazi Germany to Switzerland